Der lustige Krieg (The Merry War) is a three-act operetta composed by Johann Strauss II. The work was first performed on 25 November 1881 at the Theater an der Wien. Its libretto was by F. Zell (Camillo Walzel) and Richard Genée. The operetta was well received at its premiere, and was performed 69 times during its first run.

Roles

Synopsis
Place: The garrisoned Mediterranean city of Massa.
Time: First part of the 18th century  

It concerns a dispute between two states. The 'war' between them is played out as a game of love between Colonel Umberto Spinola, the commander-in-chief of the Genoese army, and the widowed Countess Violetta. Despite the name of the operetta, there is no fighting or bloodshed in the 'war'.

Recordings
Johann Strauss: Der lustige Krieg, Vienna Radio Symphony Orchestra, Wiener Jeunesse-Chor, Wiener Motettenchor
Conductor: Ulf Schirmer
Principal singers: Eva Mei, Jorma Silvasti, Jörg Schneider, Paul Armin Edelmann, Birgid Steinberger
Recording date: 
Label: ORF CD240

References

Operas by Johann Strauss II
1881 operas
German-language operettas
Operas
Italy in fiction